Phrataria transcissata is a moth of the family Geometridae first described by Francis Walker in 1863. It is found in Australia.

The wingspan is about 20 mm.

References

Oenochrominae
Moths described in 1863